Aldona Kmieć is an Australian contemporary artist working in Photography and Installation Art. Her works are held in public collection of State Library of Victoria, Museum of Democracy at Eureka in Ballarat, Ballarat Arts Foundation and private collections.

Awards 

 2016 Finalist, Eureka Art Prize, Ballarat
 2014 Finalist, Bowness Photography Prize 
 2014 Winner, BAF Eureka Art Prize
 2013 Artist Residency 'Under the Floorboards' by Uniting Care, Ballarat
 2012 Honourable Mention, Black & White Spider Awards
 2008 Winner, End of Year Best Photo Competition, AOP Gallery, London

Exhibitions

Solo exhibitions 

 2017 In the process of healing, Ballarat International Foto Biennale
 2015 Dreamscapes, Ballarat International Foto Biennale
 2013 We R You, Ballarat paste-up street murals
 2013 Australia, a New Chapter and Lost but Found, Ballarat International Foto Biennale

Group exhibitions 

 2021 State Library Victoria Collections: Regional bushfires and COVID recovery | Victoria Gallery
2020 Ilford CCP Salon, Centre of Contemporary Photography, Melbourne 
2018 Pol-Art Festival, Brisbane 
 2016 THIS IS ME: Examination of the art of self image, The Lost Ones Gallery, Ballarat
 2015 Beyond Reality, PolArt Festival, Victorian Artists Society, Melbourne
 2014 Bowness Photography Prize Finalist, Monash Gallery of Art, Melbourne
 2013 CCP Leica Salon, Centre of Contemporary Photography, Melbourne

Bibliography

External links 

 Artist's page

References 

1977 births
Living people
Australian photographers
Artists from Melbourne